The Metropolitan City of Genoa is one of the fourteen Metropolitan cities of Italy, located in the region of Liguria. Its capital is the city of Genoa. It replaced the Province of Genoa.

History
It was first created by the reform of local authorities (Law 142/1990) and then established by the Law 56/2014. It has been operative since January 1, 2015.

Municipalities
Main Article: List of Municipalities of the Metropolitan City of Genoa
 Arenzano
 Avegno
 Bargagli
 Bogliasco
 Borzonasca
 Busalla
 Camogli
 Campo Ligure
 Campomorone
 Carasco
 Casarza Ligure
 Casella
 Castiglione Chiavarese
 Ceranesi
 Chiavari
 Cicagna
 Cogoleto
 Cogorno
 Coreglia Ligure
 Crocefieschi
 Davagna
 Fascia
 Favale di Malvaro
 Fontanigorda
 Genova
 Gorreto
 Isola del Cantone
 Lavagna
 Leivi
 Lorsica
 Lumarzo
 Masone
 Mele
 Mezzanego
 Mignanego
 Moconesi
 Moneglia
 Montebruno
 Montoggio
 Ne
 Neirone
 Orero
 Pieve Ligure
 Portofino
 Propata
 Rapallo
 Recco
 Rezzoaglio
 Ronco Scrivia
 Rondanina
 Rossiglione
 Rovegno
 San Colombano Certenoli
 Sant'Olcese
 Santa Margherita Ligure
 Santo Stefano d'Aveto
 Savignone
 Serra Riccò
 Sestri Levante
 Sori
 Tiglieto
 Torriglia
 Tribogna
 Uscio
 Valbrevenna
 Vobbia
 Zoagli

Localities 
Main Article: List of Frazioni in the Metropolitan City of Genoa

Government
The Metropolitan City is headed by the Metropolitan Mayor (Sindaco metropolitano) and by the Metropolitan Council (Consiglio metropolitano).

List of Metropolitan Mayors of Genoa

References

External links
 Metropolitan City of Genoa official website

 
Genoa
.
Provinces of Liguria
Ligurian Sea
2015 establishments in Italy
States and territories established in 2015